Omielan is a surname. Notable people with this surname include:

 Anna Omielan (born 1993), Polish Paralympic swimmer
 Luisa Omielan (born 1982), British comedian

Polish-language surnames